Ramal de Cáceres is a closed Portuguese railway line which connected Torre das Vargens railway station, on the Linha do Leste, and Marvão-Beirã railway station, near to the border with Spain. It was completed on 15 October 1879, but was only opened on 6 June 1880. From 1881, the line was used as a faster alternative for international travelers between Portugal and Spain compared to the Linha do Leste, due to a better connection to the Spanish network. It was closed by REFER on 15 August 2012.

See also 
 List of railway lines in Portugal
 List of Portuguese locomotives and railcars
 History of rail transport in Portugal

References

Iberian gauge railways
Cac
Railway lines opened in 1879
Railway lines closed in 2012